Phrom, also known as Phrom the Great (พรหมมหาราช) or Phromkuman (พรหมกุมาร) was a ruler of Singhanavati (Yonok) realm in Lanna region (modern northern Thailand). He is the first Thai monarch who has been dubbed "Maharaja" (the Great), but his history is rarely officially recorded. Most of them are more myths or folktales rather than real history. Therefore, it could be considered that he was just a legendary king. His era is uncertain in what year, but most archaeologists estimate that it was around 857–58.

Biography
Phrom was born as Phromkuman, to Phangkarat and Devi. His father, Phangkarat was the ruler of Singhanavati. Phromkuman was said to have excellent fighting abilities. He won the war against Phraya Khom in a duel on the back of an elephant. Phraya Khom was a Khmer chancellor who captured the Singhanavati from Phangkarat. He begged his father not to pay tribute to Phraya Khom, three years have passed. Phraya Khom then moved an army to Singhanavati.

After winning the battle at the age of 16, Phangkarat gave him the title of king, but he refused and gave the throne to his older brother, Thukkitakuman. He was concerned that the enemy would attack again. Therefore, he led the army went to suppress the Khmer as far as the territory of Kamphaeng Phet, along with establishing a new town to be an outpost to prevent enemy invasion called Umongasela, later he renamed it Wiang Chai Prakan  (present-day in Wiang Chai District, Chiang Rai Province), an upstream of Kok River.

During his reign, he had built many temples in this region (Kok basins), such as Wat Mae Ngon, Wat Phra That Sop Fang, etc, as well as believed that he had brought some of the relics to be contained in the chedi of Wat Phra That Chom Kitti at present as well.

He ruled Wiang Chai Prakan for 60 years until his death at the age of 77. His only son Chaiyasiri, continued to ascend the throne.

Assumption
His story is not currently accepted by new generation Thai historians. They believe that Phrom does not exist in history, in fact, it was only the creation of heroes in the history of the Singhanavati region. It is most likely influenced by the story of Thao Hung (otherwise known as Khun Jueang), a mythical folk hero or culture hero that has been spread in various ways in Kok basins before that. Later, when Buddhism replaced animism, a folk religion. Therefore, Phra Phrom has been brought into the compound as well. It eventually became a new folklore included the name of a new king to manifest superiority over other kings in the same region.

However, according to the records of Westerners who entered the Ayutthaya kingdom during the reign of Prasat Thong, such as Van Vliet, Tachard and De La Loubère, them was stated that a number of Ayutthaya people, they also believed that Phrom was their "primeval monarch" for a long time. It was also believed among the ruling classes of Ayutthaya that he was the ancestor of U-Thong, the first sovereign and establisher of Ayutthaya kingdom.

Nowadays, a monument is being built to commemorate him in front of Mae Sai District Office, Chiang Rai Province, the site of the Singhanavati. In the perception of Mae Sai people in the present praised him as the pioneer and tutelary deity of Mae Sai. Worshiping and religious ceremonies are held in his honour and remembrance annually.

See also
Phra Ruang – another legendary king in Thai history
Khun Borom – the legendary king is associated with Khun Jueang

References

Legendary Thai people
Rulers of the Singhanavati
9th-century rulers in Asia
11th-century rulers in Asia
Heroes in mythology and legend
Folk saints
Tutelary deities